Milton McPike (October 9, 1939 – March 29, 2008) was an American educator and San Francisco 49ers player, and the principal of Madison East High School for 23 years.  He also served on the Board of Regents for the University of Wisconsin–Madison until his death in 2008.

Biography

Early life and education
Milton Lee McPike was born October 9, 1939 in Jacksonville, Illinois. He played high school football with boxer Ken Norton. He attended Northeast Missouri State University Teacher's College (now Truman State University) from 1958 to 1962. While there, he earned 12 letters in basketball, track and football.

Career
In 1962, he was a 12th-round draft pick by the San Francisco 49ers. Following his NFL experience, McPike taught and coached sports for 11 years in Quincy, Illinois.

In 1974, he moved to Madison, Wisconsin, where he served as vice principal of Madison West High School for five years. In 1979, he was appointed principal of Madison East High School. Under his leadership at East, the school gained a reputation for academic focus and was recognized as a National School of Excellence in 1989. He retired as principal in 2002. The Madison East High School Fieldhouse was named after McPike in 2005.

McPike served on several hospital and foundation boards and was named to the UW Board of Regents in 2004, resigning as regent in March 2008 for health reasons.

Marriage and children
McPike and his wife Sharon, had no children together.  McPike had three sons (Milton Jr., Jeff and Jim) with his first wife Ruth.  Sharon had three children (Scott, Kimberly and Rebecca) from a previous marriage.

Death and afterward
McPike died on March 29, 2008 in Madison, Wisconsin of adenocystic carcinoma.

Awards

1990: named one of ten "American Heroes in Education" by Reader's Digest
1997: Wisconsin State Principal of the Year
2007: Reverend Dr. Martin Luther King Jr. Humanitarian Award

References

External links
Milton McPike East Principal 'put Kids First' 
It’s About the Kids (YouTube video) by Marc Kornblatt

1939 births
2008 deaths
20th-century American educators
American sports coaches
Deaths from oral cancer
Sportspeople from Jacksonville, Illinois
Sportspeople from Quincy, Illinois
Sportspeople from Madison, Wisconsin
American school principals
Truman Bulldogs football players
Deaths from cancer in Wisconsin
Sports coaches from Wisconsin
Educators from Illinois